The 2019 Colonial Athletic Association women's basketball tournament is the upcoming postseason women's basketball tournament for the Colonial Athletic Association (CAA) for the 2018–19 NCAA Division I women's basketball season. The tournament will be held March 13–16, 2019 at the Bob Carpenter Center in Newark, Delaware. The champion will receive the CAA's automatic bid to the NCAA tournament. Towson won the conference tournament championship game over Drexel, 53–49 to send Towson to their first ever NCAA tournament.

Seeds
All 10 CAA teams participated in the tournament. Teams were seeded by conference record, with a tiebreaker system used to seed teams with identical conference records. The top six teams received a bye to the quarterfinals.
JMU Drexel and Towson have secured first round byes

Schedule

Bracket

* denotes overtime game

See also
 2019 CAA men's basketball tournament

References

External links
 2019 CAA Women's Basketball Championship

Colonial Athletic Association women's basketball tournament
 
CAA
College basketball tournaments in Delaware
Newark, Delaware